Beirut Air Bridge 1984-1998 - Provided administrative and logistical support the US Embassy in Beirut. The Air Bridge provided the only safe mode of transportation for US diplomats between Larnaca International Airport, Larnaca, Cyprus, and several landing zones in the greater Beirut area.

UH-60 "Blackhawks" from C Co 7/158th Aviation Regiment, 12th Aviation Brigade, V Corps, from Wiesbaden Air Base and Giebelstadt Army Airfield, Germany, provided the "Air Bridge" to the US Embassy in the war-torn city of Beirut, Lebanon.  Elements of this unit continued to perform this mission until July 1998.

Communication
The Tactical Satellite Radios were provided and maintained by the 1st Combat Communication Group, Lindsey Air Station, Wiesbaden, Germany. and the Signal Detachment, Support Company of the 1st Battalion, 10th Special Forces Group(Airborne); initially out of Bad Tölz and then Bublingen Germany.

References

Charles E. Kirkpatrick, "Ruck it Up!": The Post-Cold War Transformation of V Corps, 1990–2001, Department of the Army, Washington DC., 2006.

Military operations post-1945
Lebanese Civil War
Military operations involving the United States
1984 in Lebanon
Lebanon–United States relations